A list of the films produced in Mexico in 1981 (see 1981 in film):

1981

External links

1981
Films
Lists of 1981 films by country or language